The Liverpool Rock & Roll Marathon was a running race that took place in Liverpool, United Kingdom as part of the Rock & Roll Marathon series. Generally the event was held in May. As it is part of the Rock and Roll race series stages are set up along the route with bands and live entertainment. The race was postponed in 2020 due to the COVID pandemic and was re-scheduled for October 2021 but in September of that year it was announced that the race would not be returning after their upcoming event.

Distances

Held over Saturday and Sunday the event featured One Mile, 5k, half marathon and marathon distance races.

Route

Typically the race started at the Albert Dock. The Marathon route heads north towards the city's football stadia before heading back towards the town centre and south towards Sefton Park before returning via the riverfront promenade. The course is drawn up to encompass as many of the city's musical landmarks as possible including Mathew Street and Penny Lane.

The races finish outside the Liverpool Echo Arena.

Past winners

Marathon

Half Marathon

Concert
After the race an open air concert was held for finishers and members of the public with bands such as Cast, Republica and Space headlining.

References

External links
Official website
Event organisers, Competitor Group of San Diego, California, USA

Sports competitions in Liverpool
Half marathons in the United Kingdom
Marathons in the United Kingdom
Sports festivals in the United Kingdom
2015 establishments in England
2021 disestablishments in England
Recurring sporting events established in 2015
Recurring sporting events disestablished in 2021